Potentilla nitida, the Pink Cinquefoil, is a species of cinquefoil in the family Rosaceae that is endemic to the Alps where it grows on elevation of .

References

nitida
Flora of the Alps
Taxa named by Carl Linnaeus